Büyük Maden Island (literally Big Mine Island) is an Aegean island of Turkey

It is between Cunda Island and Küçük Maden Island. The island currently is uninhabited.

The ancient name of the island was Pyrgos. In the antiquity there were lead mines in the island and the island was foul-smelling. The settlement in the island was named Pordoselene which had a nasty meaning. According to Bilge Umar, Strabon was uneasy with the name of the island and he used the name Poroselene instead. On some rocks of the island there are traces of malachite.

References

Aegean islands
Islands of Turkey
Islands of Balıkesir Province
Ayvalık